Wythenshawe Park is a tram stop for Phase 3b of the Manchester Metrolink. The station opened on 3 November 2014 and is on the Airport Line on Wythenshawe Road near the junction of Moor Road.

Services
Trams run every 12 minutes north to Victoria and south to Manchester Airport. Between 03:00 and 06:00, a service operates between Deansgate-Castlefield and Manchester Airport every 20 minutes.

Ticket zones 
Wythenshawe Park stop is located in Metrolink ticket zone 3.

References

External links

 Metrolink stop information
 Wythenshawe Park area map
 Light Rail Transit Association
 Airport route map

Tram stops in Manchester
Railway stations in Great Britain opened in 2014
2014 establishments in England